is a river in Hokkaidō, Japan.

External links
 Tokoro River Floods

Rivers of Hokkaido
Rivers of Japan